Turung may refer to:

 Turung people, a people of north-east India
 Turung language, the Tibeto-Burman language they speak